Bhagirathi Parbat III (Hindi: भागीरथी पर्वत III) is a mountain in Uttarakhand, India. It is the 95th highest peak located entirely within Uttarakhand, India. (The highest in this category is Nanda Devi.) It is the third highest peak of the Bhagirathi Massif. It was first climbed by Britishers Kolin Kirkus and Charles Warren in 1933, by way of the southeast ridge.

Climbing history

Its first ascent by Britishers Kolin Kirkus and Charles Warren was completed in 1933. The first successful ascent by an Indian was on 20 October 1966. Janez Jeglic and Silvo Karo climbed the overhanging west face On 7 September 1990.

On 15 September 2015 at 11:15 am Debabrata Mukherjee and his team successfully summited Mt. Bhagirathi III via the north ridge.

Neighboring and subsidiary peaks
The following are neighboring or subsidiary peaks:
 Bhagirathi Parbat I, 6,856 m (22493 ft)
 Bhagirathi Parbat II, 6,512 m (21365 ft)
 Satopanth, 7,075 m (23,212 ft), 
 Vasuki Parbat, 6,792 m (22,283 ft),

Glaciers and rivers
Glaciers associated with the mountain include Gangotri Glacier (east flank), Vasuki Glacier (west flank), and Chaturangi Glacier (north flank). The Bhagirathi river (also called Ganga or Ganges) emerges from the terminus of Gangotri Glacier.

References

Mountains of Uttarakhand
Six-thousanders of the Himalayas
Geography of Chamoli district